Marat Rustemovich Sitdikov (born 23 July 1991) is a Russian professional football player. He plays for FC Neftekhimik Nizhnekamsk.

Club career
He made his Russian Football National League debut for FC Neftekhimik Nizhnekamsk on 8 March 2017 in a game against FC Zenit-2 Saint Petersburg.

External links
 

1991 births
Footballers from Kazan
Living people
Russian footballers
Russia youth international footballers
Association football midfielders
FC Rubin Kazan players
FC Neftekhimik Nizhnekamsk players
FC Aktobe players
Russian First League players
Russian Second League players
Kazakhstan Premier League players
Russian expatriate footballers
Expatriate footballers in Kazakhstan
Russian expatriate sportspeople in Kazakhstan